Brooker is a surname. Notable people with the surname include:

Alex Brooker (born 1984), English journalist and presenter
Bertram Brooker (1888–1955), Canadian writer
Bob Brooker (1926–1986), Australian rules footballer
Charlie Brooker (ice hockey) (1932–2020), Canadian ice hockey player
Charlie Brooker (born 1971), British television presenter, journalist and writer
Chris Brooker (born 1986), English rugby union player
Daphne Brooker (1927–2012), British model, costume designer, and fashion professor
Edward Brooker (1891–1948), Australian politician, 31st Premier of Tasmania
Gary Brooker (1945–2022), British musician
Greg Brooker (screenwriter), American screenwriter
Greg Brooker (music producer) (born 1981), British music producer
Ian Brooker (1934–2016), Australian botanist
Ian Brooker (actor) (born 1959), British actor
James Brooker (1902–1973), American athlete
John Brooker (1861–1947) founder of Brooker & Sons, Australian preserved fruit makers
Justin Brooker (born 1977), Australian rugby league footballer
Lesley Brooker, Australian ornithologist
Matt Brooker, British comics artist
Mervyn Brooker (1954–2019), English cricketer and school headmaster
Michael Brooker, Australian ornithologist
Moira Brooker (born 1957), British actress
Murray Ian Hill Brooker (1934–2016), Australian botanist
Patricia Brooker, cast member in British TV reality show The Only Way Is Essex
Paul Brooker  (born 1976), English footballer
Richard Brooker (1954–2013), English stunt performer
Scott Brooker, British puppeteer
Steve Brooker (born 1981), English football player
Thomas Henry Brooker (1850–1927), politician in South Australia, brother of John
Todd Brooker (born 1959), Canadian alpine ski racer and TV commentator
Tommy Brooker (1939–2019), American football player
Tony Brooker (1925–2019), British computer scientist

Fictional characters with the surname 

 Emma Brooker, character from the British soap-opera Coronation Street

See also
Brookers
Brookes
Brooks (surname)
Booker (disambiguation)